is a railway station in the city of Tochigi, Tochigi Prefecture. Japan, operated jointly by the East Japan Railway Company (JR East) and the private railway operator Tobu Railway.

Lines
It is also a station on the JR East Ryōmō Line and is 10.8 km from the starting point of that line at Oyama Station.

Station layout

JR East station

The JR East station consists of one island platform serving two tracks, connected to the station building by a footbridge.

Tobu Railway station

The Tobu Station consists of one elevated side platform and one elevated island platform serving three tracks, with the station building located underneath.

Platforms

History
The JR East Ryōmō Line station opened on 22 May 1888. The Tōbu station opened on 1 April 1929. It was rebuilt as an elevated station on 17 May 2000.

From 17 March 2012, station numbering was introduced on all Tobu lines, with Tochigi Station becoming "TN-11".

Passenger statistics
In fiscal 2019, the Tobu station was used by an average of 11,449 passengers daily. The JR East station was used by 4,857 passengers (alighting) daily.

Surrounding area
Tochigi city center
Tochigi City Hall

Bus routes
THS
For Sano Shintoshi Bus Terminal

See also
 List of railway stations in Japan

References

External links

 Tochigi Station information (JR East) 
 Tochigi Station information (Tobu) 

Railway stations in Tochigi Prefecture
Stations of East Japan Railway Company
Stations of Tobu Railway
Railway stations in Japan opened in 1888
Tobu Nikko Line
Ryōmō Line
Tochigi, Tochigi